Sosthene-Taroum Moguenara (born 17 October 1989) is a German long jumper. She competed at the 2012 Summer Olympics in London, but failed to qualify for the final. In 2011 Moguenara won the bronze medal at the European Athletics U23 Championships in Ostrava.

Competition record

References

1989 births
Living people
People from Sarh
Chadian emigrants to Germany
Athletes (track and field) at the 2012 Summer Olympics
Athletes (track and field) at the 2016 Summer Olympics
German female long jumpers
Olympic athletes of Germany
World Athletics Championships athletes for Germany